Events from the year 1638 in England.

Incumbents
 Monarch – Charles I
 Secretary of State – Sir John Coke

Events
 18 April – flogging of John Lilburne for refusing to swear an oath when brought before the court of Star Chamber for distributing Puritan publications.
 12 June – trial of John Hampden for non-payment of ship money concludes: a narrow majority of judges find the tax to be legal.
 21 October – The Great Thunderstorm at Widecombe-in-the-Moor in Devon: 4 are killed and around 60 injured when probable ball lightning strikes the parish church.
 The Queen's House at Greenwich, designed by Inigo Jones in 1616 as the first major example of classical architecture in the country, is completed for Henrietta Maria.
 John Milton's elegy "Lycidas" is published.

Births
 24 January – Charles Sackville, 6th Earl of Dorset, poet and courtier (died 1706)
 6 March– Henry Capell, 1st Baron Capell, First Lord of the British Admiralty (died 1696)
 2 June – Henry Hyde, 2nd Earl of Clarendon, politician (died 1709)
 24 December – Ralph Montagu, 1st Duke of Montagu, diplomat (died 1709)
 William Sacheverell, statesman (died 1691)

Deaths
 14 September – John Harvard, clergyman and colonist (born 1607)

References

 
Years of the 17th century in England